The Albatros W.4 was a German floatplane derivative of the Albatros D.I fighter with new wing and tail surfaces of greater span than the D.I.  One hundred eighteen examples (including three prototypes) were built between June 1916 and December 1917.  The aircraft operated in the North Sea and Baltic theatres and later served as training aircraft.

The W.4 was powered by the same 120 kW (160 hp) Mercedes D.III engine fitted to the D.I and based on the same fuselage.  The first production series W.4s were armed with one lMG08 7.92 mm (.312 in) machine gun.  Later aircraft carried two guns.

Operators
 
Luftstreitkräfte - 118 aircraft
 
KuKLFT - 8 aircraft delivered in July 1918

Specifications (W.4)

References

Bibliography

 Green, W. & Swanborough, G. (1994). The Complete Book of Fighters. London: Salamander Books. 

 
 luftfahrt-archiv.de
 Grosz, Peter M. (1995). Albatros W4. Windsock Mini Datafile No. 1. Berkhamsted: Albatros Productions. .

Biplanes
Single-engined tractor aircraft
1910s German fighter aircraft
Floatplanes
W.4
Aircraft first flown in 1916